Ebed-Melech ( ‘Eḇeḏmeleḵ;) is mentioned in the Book of Jeremiah chapter 38 as an Ethiopian official at the palace of king Zedekiah of Judah during the Siege of Jerusalem (597 BCE). The name is translated as Servant of the King, and as such may not be his proper name but a royal title.  The text relates that he was a Cushite.
Ebed-Melech is notable for rescuing the prophet Jeremiah from the cistern into which he had been cast to his death. Later Jeremiah relayed God's message to him saying that he, Ebed-Melech, would "not fall by the sword" during the Fall of Jerusalem to the Babylonians because he had put his trust in Him (God).

See also
Entering heaven alive
Proselyte
Baruch ben Neriah

References

6th-century BC people
Hebrew Bible people
Eunuchs
Jeremiah
Book of Jeremiah
Entering heaven alive
Ethiopian people
Ancient slaves